Kleinwort Benson Ltd v Birmingham CC [1996] 4 All ER 733 is an English unjust enrichment law case, concerning to what extent enrichment of the defendant must be at the expense of the claimant. It rejected a defence of "passing on" the gain against a claim of unjust enrichment.

Facts
Kleinwort Benson, a bank, paid Birmingham City Council money under interest rate swap agreements that were later declared to be ultra vires and void by the House of Lords. The council argued it did not have to repay the money because the bank had passed on its losses through hedging transactions long before.

Judgment
The Court of Appeal rejected that there could be a passing on defence. It rejected that there was any analogy to compensating for loss, so that it could be avoided or passed on. First, the payments received by the bank under the hedge contract were not causally connected with the payments of the bank under the swap contract. Second, the claims in unjust enrichment are not subject to a restriction on the defendant’s gain that it must correspond with loss. Evans LJ gave the leading judgment, referring to American, Australian and Canadian authority outlining the problems of a passing on defence. Saville LJ gave the second judgment.

Morritt LJ concurred.

See also

English unjust enrichment law
Local authorities swaps litigation

Notes

References

Bibliography

English unjust enrichment case law
English derivatives case law
Court of Appeal (England and Wales) cases
1996 in British law
1996 in case law